Naw Christ Tun ( also known as Arkar Moe; born 8 December 1963) is a Burmese politician who currently serves as an Amyotha Hluttaw MP for Kayin State No. 7 constituency. She is a member of National League for Democracy.

Early life and education 
Naw was born on 8 December 1963 in Thandaunggyi Township, Kayin State, Myanmar. She is an ethnic Karen. She graduated with B.V.S.

Political career 
She has served as the chairman of National League for Democracy of Thandaunggyi Township. In the 2015 Myanmar general election, she was elected as an Amyotha Hluttaw MP for Kayin State No. 7 parliamentary constituency, winning a majority of 14617 votes.  She also serves as the member of Amyotha Hluttaw's Hluttaw Rights Committee.

References 

National League for Democracy politicians
1963 births
Living people
People from Kayin State
Burmese people of Karen descent